The 1922–23 Illinois Fighting Illini men's basketball team represented the University of Illinois.

Regular season
Craig Ruby, a two-time All-American and All-Missouri Valley Conference forward for the University of Missouri Tigers, came to the University of Illinois after being the head coach of his alma-mater from 1920–1922. Compiling a record of 33 wins and only 2 losses at Missouri, Ruby was recruited by University of Illinois athletic director George Huff to take over the Fighting Illini’s men’s basketball coaching duties. The 1922–23 season, the first of 14 for Ruby, was also the first of twelve winning seasons as head coach. During this season, five of the Illini's six losses were at the hands of Big Ten Conference opponents, placing them in a tie for fourth place. The overall record for this team was nine wins and six losses. The Big Ten record for the season was seven wins and five losses. The starting lineup included captain Norton Hellstrom, Wally Roettger and G.E. Potter at forward, Leland Stillwell at center, and Jack Lipe and R.H. Popken as guards.

Roster

Source

Schedule
												
Source																

|-	
!colspan=12 style="background:#DF4E38; color:white;"| Non-Conference regular season
|- align="center" bgcolor=""

			

|-	
!colspan=9 style="background:#DF4E38; color:#FFFFFF;"|Big Ten regular season

Bold Italic connotes conference game

Awards and honors

References

Illinois Fighting Illini
Illinois Fighting Illini men's basketball seasons
Illinois Fighting Illini men's b
Illinois Fighting Illini men's b